The open-mid front rounded vowel, or low-mid front rounded vowel, is a type of vowel sound, used in some spoken languages. The symbol œ is a lowercase ligature of the letters o and e. The sound , a small capital version of the  ligature, is used for a distinct vowel sound: the open front rounded vowel.

Open-mid front compressed vowel
There is no dedicated IPA diacritic for compression. The spread-lip diacritic  may also be used with a rounded vowel letter  as an ad hoc symbol, but 'spread' technically means unrounded.

Features

Occurrence
Because front rounded vowels are assumed to have compression, and few descriptions cover the distinction, some of the following may actually have protrusion.

Open-mid front protruded vowel

Catford notes that most languages with rounded front and back vowels use distinct types of labialization, protruded back vowels and compressed front vowels. However, a few, such as Scandinavian languages, have protruded front vowels. One Scandinavian language, Swedish, even contrasts the two types of rounding in front vowels (see near-close front rounded vowel, with Swedish examples of both types of rounding).

As there are no diacritics in the IPA to distinguish protruded and compressed rounding, an old diacritic for labialization, will be used here as an ad hoc symbol for protruded front vowels.

Acoustically, the sound is "between" the more typical compressed open-mid front vowel  and the unrounded open-mid front vowel .

Features

Occurrence

Notes

References

External links
 

Open-mid vowels
Front vowels
Rounded vowels